Ancylodes dealbatella is a species of snout moth in the genus Ancylodes. It was described by Nikolay Grigoryevich Erschoff in 1874 and is known from Turkmenistan, Iraq, Libya, Spain and Russia.

The wingspan is about 17 mm.

References

Moths described in 1860
Phycitini
Moths of Europe
Moths of Asia